Thomas Jeb Hensarling (born May 29, 1957) is an American politician who served as the U.S. representative for Texas's 5th congressional district from 2003 to 2019. A member of the  Republican Party, he chaired the House Republican Conference from 2011 to 2013 and House Financial Services Committee from 2013 until 2019. A leading opponent of regulating the financial industry, Hensarling has close ties to Wall Street, having received campaign donations from every major Wall Street bank as well as various payday lenders.

On October 31, 2017, Hensarling announced that he would not seek reelection in 2018. In 2019, he revealed he was joining UBS Group AG as executive vice chairman for the Americas region.

Early life
Hensarling was born in Stephenville, the seat of government of Erath County in Central Texas; he was reared on the family farm in College Station. He is the son of Mary Ann (Brock) and Charles Andrew "Chase" Hensarling (1928–2014), a 1949 graduate of Texas A&M University and a United States Army officer, who was engaged in the poultry business. His parents married in 1953.  Jeb Hensarling has one brother, James Andrew Hensarling (born 1954), and a sister, Carolyn Hensarling Arizpe. He is an Episcopalian.

Like his late father, Jeb Hensarling graduated from Texas A&M University; he received a bachelor's degree in economics in 1979. In 1982, he earned a Juris Doctor degree from the University of Texas School of Law at Austin.

Political career

Prior to serving in Congress, Hensarling was State Director for Texas Senator Phil Gramm from 1985 until 1989. He also managed Gramm's re-election campaign in 1992. From 1991 to 1993, he served as executive director of the Republican Senatorial Committee.

Hensarling next served as a vice president at two companies before becoming owner of San Jacinto Ventures in 1996 and CEO of Family Support Assurance Corporation in 2001. He served as vice president of Green Mountain Energy from 1999 to 2001.

Hensarling was elected to his first term in 2002, defeating Democratic opponent Ron Chapman with 58 percent of the vote. He was reelected in 2004 with 64 percent of the vote over Democratic challenger Bill Bernstein. In 2006, he was reelected with 62% of the votes over Charlie Thompson (D) with 36%, and in 2008 with 84% against Ken Ashby (L) with 16%. In 2010, Hensarling was reelected with 71% of the votes, in 2012 with 64% and in 2014 with 85%. In 2016 Hensarling gained a total of 80% of the votes and defeated Ken Ashby, who had received 20% of the votes.

A December 31, 2005, article in National Review profiled his work as the country's "budget nanny", saying that he replaced his mentor, former Senator Phil Gramm, in this role. Hensarling's proposed legislation was said to be intended to force Congress to "decide how much money they can afford to spend, and then prioritize within those limits." The article said that "the chief problem with any proposal to reform the budget process is that it excites almost nobody."

Hensarling was elected chairman of the Republican Study Committee following the 2006 congressional elections, defeating Todd Tiahrt.

From 2011 to 2013, Hensarling was chairman of the House Republican Conference. He served on the Congressional Oversight Panel of the Troubled Asset Relief Program, the National Commission on Fiscal Responsibility and Reform. Hensarling was also co-chair of the Joint Select Committee on Deficit Reduction.

After the 2012 election, Hensarling was elected as chairman of the House Committee on Financial Services, succeeding Rep. Spencer Bachus (R-Ala.).

After the election of Donald Trump as president, Hensarling met with the transition team and left thinking he had been selected to be secretary of the treasury. Eventually, Steven Mnuchin was given the position.

Legislation

Hensarling opposed the Homeowner Flood Insurance Affordability Act of 2013 (H.R. 3370; 113th Congress), a bill that would delay some of the reforms to the National Flood Insurance Program. Hensarling criticized the bill, saying the bill would "postpone actuarially sound rates for perhaps a generation ... (and) kill off a key element of risk-based pricing permanently, which is necessary if we are to ever transition to market competition." Hensarling criticized the National Flood Insurance Programs for regularly underestimating flood risk. Hensarling is an opponent of the Dodd–Frank Wall Street Reform and Consumer Protection Act.

Committee assignments
 Committee on Financial Services (Chair)
 Subcommittee on Capital Markets, Insurance, and Government-Sponsored Enterprises
 Subcommittee on Financial Institutions and Consumer Credit
 Joint Select Committee on Deficit Reduction (Co-chair)

Voting record

Hensarling maintained a conservative voting record: he consistently voted against pro-choice legislation, stem cell research, same-sex marriage and hate crimes legislation, and consistently supported free trade policies, the PATRIOT Act, and a constitutional amendment against flag burning.

Hensarling served on the House Committee on the Budget and chaired the House Committee on Financial Services. Hensarling was co-author of a constitutional amendment (known as the Spending Limit Amendment) that would prohibit federal spending from growing faster than the economy. Hensarling campaigned for Congress to enact a one-year moratorium on all Congressional earmarks, saying that the process needs to be overhauled. In 2007, he introduced the Taxpayer Bill of Rights. He also co-authored the Taxpayer Choice Act.

A vocal critic of the Consumer Financial Protection Bureau (CFPB), he received $210,500 from the payday lending industry (directly and through his political action committee) during the 2013-2014 election cycle, according to a report from the nonprofit Americans for Financial Reform.

2008 
In January 2008, Hensarling was co-author of the Economic Growth Act of 2008.

In May 2008, Hensarling campaigned for the Republican party leadership in the House to agree to a special session to give lawmakers to air their views on a new policy platform and share ideas on how to define themselves to better advantage going into the 2008 election.

2010 
On January 29, 2010, during President Barack Obama's meeting with House Republicans, Hensarling challenged Obama's position on the budget, asserting that the Obama White House was increasing the national deficit at the same rate per month that the previous President had increased it per year.  President Obama responded with the following: "the whole question was structured as a talking point for running a campaign. ... [t]he fact of the matter is that when we came into office, the deficit was $1.3 trillion. So when you say that suddenly I've got a monthly budget that is higher than the annual – or a monthly deficit that's higher than the annual deficit left by Republicans, that's factually just not true, and you know it's not true."  The Congressional Budget Office issued a projection in January 2009, before Obama took office, that the budget deficit would reach $1.2 trillion that year.

Financial bailout 
In September 2008, Hensarling led House Republican efforts to oppose Secretary Henry Paulson and Chairman Ben Bernanke's $700 billion financial bailout, and urged caution before Congress rushed to approve the plan. After voting against the bill, Hensarling said,

Following September 29 House vote, the Dow Jones Industrial Average dropped 777 points in a single day, its largest single-day point drop ever.  The House subsequently passed the bill in a second vote on October 3.

On November 19, 2008, Hensarling was appointed by United States House of Representatives Minority Leader John Boehner to serve on the five-member Congressional Oversight Panel created to oversee the implementation of the Emergency Economic Stabilization Act. He was the lone dissenting member on the "Accountability for the Troubled Asset Relief Program" report issued by the panel on January 9, 2009.

House leadership 
In 2008, Hensarling was mentioned as a possible candidate for Republican Conference Chairman, then the number three position in the House Republican leadership. However, Hensarling instead endorsed former Republican Study Committee Chairman Mike Pence, a longtime friend and ally. After the 2010 elections, Pence stepped down from the House to run for Governor of Indiana. Hensarling succeeded Pence as Conference Chairman, becoming the fourth-ranking Republican, as the Republican Party had won control of the House of Representatives in 2010.  Hensarling stepped down from leadership after the 2012 elections to become Chairman of the House Financial Services Committee.

Prior to Eric Cantor's primary defeat, Hensarling was mentioned as a potential rival to Cantor to succeed John Boehner as leader of the House Republicans.

References

External links 
 
 
 

|-

|-

|-

|-

1957 births
21st-century American politicians
American chief executives
American Episcopalians
Living people
People from College Station, Texas
People from Erath County, Texas
People from Stephenville, Texas
Republican Party members of the United States House of Representatives from Texas
Texas A&M University alumni